Francis North, 2nd Baron Guilford PC (14 December 1673 – 17 October 1729) was a British peer and member of the House of Lords.

Life
In 1685, he succeeded his father Francis North as Baron Guilford. In 1701 he was one of five peers of the realm who voted against the Act of Settlement (which excluded the House of Stuart from the English throne) in the House of Lords, and who felt strongly enough to enter written protests in the House of Lords Journal. From 1703 to 1705, Guilford was Lord Lieutenant of Essex. In 1712, he was appointed to the Privy Council, and was First Lord of Trade from 1713 to 1714.

Family
North was twice married. His first wife was Elizabeth, daughter of Fulke Greville, 5th Baron Brooke, and Sarah Dashwood, whom he married in 1695. His second wife was Alicia Brownlow, daughter of Sir John Brownlow, 3rd Baronet, and Alice Sherard, whom he married around 1703.

Guilford was succeeded by his son by his second wife Francis North, 3rd Baron Guilford, who later became 1st Earl of Guilford.

References

Dictionary of National Biography, North, Francis, first Baron Guilford (1637–1685), lord chancellor, by Augustus Jessopp. Published 1894.
http://thepeerage.com/p3022.htm#i30219

1673 births
1729 deaths
17th-century English nobility
18th-century English nobility
Lord-Lieutenants of Essex
Members of the Privy Council of Great Britain
Francis
Presidents of the Board of Trade
Barons Guilford